Antoni Opolski (11 June 1913 – 17 March 2014) was a Polish physicist. His field was astronomy and astrophysics. After World War II, he worked at the astronomical observatory of the University of Wrocław. He retired in 1983. He was born in Rozwadów (now Lviv Oblast, Ukraine). He died from natural causes on 17 March 2014 in Wrocław, Poland. He was 100 years old. His funeral was held on 22 March.

References

External links
 Antoni Opolski biography at the University of Opole website 

1913 births
2014 deaths
Polish astrophysicists
20th-century Polish astronomers
Polish centenarians
People from Buchach
Men centenarians